This is a list of leaders of the China's Government institutions. Each institution of China is headed by a chairperson or secretary, with some being more prominent than others. The paramount leader holds the highest authority of the Chinese Communist Party (CCP) and Government of the People's Republic of China (PRC).

Current office holders

Other important institutions

Historic office holders

See also
List of national leaders of the People's Republic of China

China politics-related lists
Lists of leaders of China
Lists of Chinese people